The 1964 Washington gubernatorial election took place on November 3, 1964, between incumbent Democratic governor Albert Rosellini and Republican nominee Daniel J. Evans.

Rosellini, a former state senator, was elected governor in 1956 and re-elected in 1960; he had become unpopular after a series of scandals and increasing partisan division in the state legislature. Evans was a member of the state house of representatives and became the minority leader for the Republicans.

Despite the state's favoring of Democrats in national elections in 1964, Evans won by a large margin using a "Blueprint for Progress" as a cornerstone of his campaign. John Patric unsuccessfully ran in the blanket primary.

General election

Results

References

Washington
1964
Gubernatorial
November 1964 events in the United States